Maxville is an unincorporated community in White River Township, Randolph County, in the U.S. state of Indiana.

History
Maxville was founded ca. 1832.

Geography

References

Unincorporated communities in Randolph County, Indiana
Unincorporated communities in Indiana
Populated places established in the 1830s
1830s establishments in Indiana